Joseph Oriel Eaton II (July 28, 1873 – 1949) was born in Yonkers, New York. At birth, he was named Harrison Eaton but his mother changed his name as a tribute, after Harrison's father, the painter Joseph Oriel Eaton I, died.

Joseph was raised in Cincinnati and attended Williams College in Massachusetts. He was one of the founders of Torbensen Gear and Axle Company which is known today as Eaton Corporation.

He was inducted into the Automotive Hall of Fame in 1983.

References
 The History of Eaton Corporation 1911-1985

1873 births
1949 deaths
Williams College alumni